Pogon ( or Pogoni, Pogoni), is a former commune in the Gjirokastër County, southern Albania. At the 2015 local government reform it became a subdivision of the municipality Dropull. The population at the 2011 census was 432. It consists of seven villages which are mostly Greek speaking: Poliçan; Skore; Hllomo; Sopik; Mavrojer; Çatistë and Selckë of which Poliçan is the administrative center. The administrative unit of Pogon is inhabited by ethnic Greeks.

Demographics
Greek is spoken in Poliçan, Skore, Hllomo, Sopik, Mavrojer and Çatistë and those villages along with Drymadhes on the Greek side of the border  comprise the sub-region of Paleo-Pogoni (Old Pogoni), part of the wider region of Pogoni. Traditionally Greeks of Pogoni in Albania practised endogamy by intermarrying within their group, although occasionally brides from Zagori were taught to speak Greek. Poliçan is the northernmost Greek speaking village in the Pogoni area, as villages north west of Poliçan are Albanian speaking. Selckë, part of a wider region of Lunxhëria, is traditionally inhabited by an Orthodox Albanian population as well as later Aromanian migrants, while the rest of the villages belong to the Greek minority zone.

History
In 15th century Pogon came under Ottoman rule and became part of the Sanjak of Ioannina. It was a nahiya centre as "Pogun" at Pogun kaza (Its centre was Voştina) in Ergiri sanjak of Yanya Vilayet till 1912. As part of Albania, the municipality is part of the recognized Greek Minority Zone.

Historically each village of Pogon has its own variation of traditional costumes and dresses. The area is part of Pogoni, a region that also includes parts of nearby Pogoni on the Greek side of the border.

Culture
The villages of Pogon (except Selckë) are part of the wider Pogoni region, which is divided between Greece (40 villages) and Albania (7 villages). Polyphonic singing, although shared among several ethnic groups, tends to be mostly identified with the Pogoni area.

Notable people
 Sophianos (-1711), local Greek-Orthodox bishop and scholar.
 Pandeli Sotiri, Albanian patriot, main contributor to the modern Albanian alphabet

References

Further reading
ΖΩΤΟΥ, ΜΕΝΕΛΑΟΥ; ΓΙΑΝΝΑΡΟΥ, ΧΡΙΣΤΟΦΟΡΟΥ. Η ΠΟΛΥΤΣΑΝΗ ΤΗΣ ΒΟΡΕΙΟΥ ΗΠΕΙΡΟΥ. ΕΚΔΟΣΕΙΣ, ΙΩΑΝΝΙΝΑ, 1989. 
Politsanitika Nea Newspaper, Tel. +30 210 5238058

See also
Mount Nemërçkë

Former municipalities in Gjirokastër County
Administrative units of Dropull
Albanian ethnographic regions